Chloroclystis semiscripta is a moth in the  family Geometridae. It is found in New Guinea and on Sulawesi, Borneo and Peninsular Malaysia. The habitat consists of lower and upper montane areas.

Subspecies
Chloroclystis semiscripta semiscripta (New Guinea)
Chloroclystis semiscripta brychoma Prout, 1958 (Sulawesi, Borneo, Peninsular Malaysia)

References

External links

Moths described in 1906
semiscripta